Phytol (florasol, phytosol) is an acyclic hydrogenated diterpene alcohol that can be used as a precursor for the manufacture of synthetic forms of vitamin E and vitamin K1.  In ruminants, the gut fermentation of ingested plant materials liberates phytol, a constituent of chlorophyll, which is then converted to phytanic acid and stored in fats.  In shark liver it yields pristane.

Human pathology
Refsum disease (also known as adult Refsum disease) is an autosomal recessive disorder that results in the accumulation of toxic stores of phytanic acid in tissues and frequently manifests as a variable combination of peripheral polyneuropathy, cerebellar ataxia, retinitis pigmentosa, anosmia, and hearing loss. Although humans cannot derive phytanic acid from chlorophyll, they can convert free phytol into phytanic acid. Thus, patients with Refsum disease should limit their intake of phytanic acid and free phytol. The amount of free phytol in numerous food products has been reported.

Roles in nature
Insects, such as the sumac flea beetle, are reported to use phytol and its metabolites (e.g. phytanic acid) as chemical deterrents against predation. These compounds originate from host plants.

Indirect evidence has been provided that, in contrast to humans, diverse non-human primates can derive significant amounts of phytol from the hindgut fermentation of plant materials.

Modulator of transcription
Phytol and/or its metabolites have been reported to bind to and/or activate the transcription factors PPAR-alpha and retinoid X receptor (RXR). The metabolites phytanic acid and pristanic acid are naturally occurring ligands. In mice, oral phytol induces massive proliferation of peroxisomes in several organs.

Possible biomedical applications
Phytol has been investigated for its potential anxiolytic, metabolism-modulating, cytotoxic, antioxidant, autophagy- and apoptosis-inducing, antinociceptive, anti-inflammatory, immune-modulating, and antimicrobial effects.

Geochemical biomarker
Phytol is likely the most abundant acyclic isoprenoid compound present in the biosphere and its degradation products have been used as biogeochemical tracers in aquatic environments.

Commercial applications
Phytol is used in the fragrance industry and used in cosmetics, shampoos, toilet soaps, household cleaners, and detergents. Phytol is also used in some Cannabis distillate vapes as a diluent. Its worldwide use has been estimated to be approximately 0.1–1.0 metric tons per year.

See also
 Isophytol
 Phytantriol

References

Primary alcohols
Diterpenes
Alkene derivatives